Anton Johan Rønneberg (9 August 1902 – 7 May 1989) was a Norwegian writer, theatre critic, dramaturg and theatre director.

Rønneberg was a theatre critic for several Oslo newspapers: Norges Kommunistblad in 1924, Middagsavisen from 1925 to 1927, Morgenbladet from 1928 to 1930 and Aftenposten. He was the acting theatre director for the National Theatre from 1933 to 1934. He wrote several books, including Teater hjemme og ute (1945), a biography on actress Tore Segelcke (1946), and two volumes on the history of Nationaltheatret.

References

1902 births
1989 deaths
Historians of theatre
Norwegian theatre directors
Norwegian biographers
Norwegian male writers
Male biographers
20th-century Norwegian writers
20th-century biographers
Order of the Polar Star
20th-century male writers
Anton
Holmboe family